Jennifer Louise Gunn  (born 9 May 1986) is an English former cricketer who plays as a right-arm medium bowler and right-handed batter. She appeared in 11 Test matches, 144 One Day Internationals and 104 Twenty20 Internationals for England between 2004 and her international retirement in October 2019. She played domestic cricket for Nottinghamshire, Yorkshire, Warwickshire, Yorkshire Diamonds, Loughborough Lightning, Northern Diamonds, Northern Superchargers, South Australia and Western Australia.

Early career
A slow seam bowler and lower-middle-order batsman, she is the daughter of former Nottingham Forest player Bryn Gunn. She plays for Nottinghamshire and Western Australia and made her Test debut at 17 against New Zealand at Scarborough in 2004. She also plays for Ransome & Marles CC, Newark, Nottinghamshire.  A late injury forced her out of the Women's World Cup final in Sydney in 2009 but she was at the crease when England defeated New Zealand in the Twenty/20 World Championship final at Lords.

International career
She was vice-captain of the England side that beat Australia in the female version of the Ashes in 2013 and 2013-14. She was appointed Member of the Order of the British Empire (MBE) in the 2014 Birthday Honours for services to cricket.

She is the holder of one of the first tranche of 18 ECB central contracts for women players, which were announced in April 2014. She signed for Warwickshire ahead of the 2016 season.

Gunn was a member of the winning women's team at the 2017 Women's Cricket World Cup held in England.

In March 2018, during the 2018 Women's T20I Tri Nations Series in India, Gunn became the first cricketer, male or female, to play in 100 T20 International matches.

In October 2018, she was named in England's squad for the 2018 ICC Women's World Twenty20 tournament in the West Indies.

In February 2019, she was awarded a full central contract by the England and Wales Cricket Board (ECB) for 2019. In June 2019, the ECB named her in England's squad for their opening match against Australia to contest the Women's Ashes.

In October 2019, Gunn announced her retirement from international cricket.

Domestic cricket
In April 2022, she was signed by the Northern Superchargers for the 2022 season of The Hundred. She announced her retirement from all cricket at the end of the 2022 season.

References

External links
 
 

1986 births
Living people
Cricketers from Nottingham
England women Test cricketers
England women One Day International cricketers
England women Twenty20 International cricketers
Members of the Order of the British Empire
Loughborough Lightning cricketers
Northern Diamonds cricketers
Nottinghamshire women cricketers
South Australian Scorpions cricketers
Warwickshire women cricketers
Western Australia women cricketers
Yorkshire women cricketers
Yorkshire Diamonds cricketers
Northern Superchargers cricketers